In functional analysis and related areas of mathematics a Brauner space is a complete compactly generated locally convex space  having a sequence of compact sets  such that every other compact set  is contained in some .

Brauner spaces are named after Kalman George Brauner, who began their study. All Brauner spaces are stereotype and are in the stereotype duality relations with Fréchet spaces:
 for any Fréchet space  its stereotype dual space  is a Brauner space,
 and vice versa, for any Brauner space  its stereotype dual space  is a Fréchet space.

Special cases of Brauner spaces are Smith spaces.

Examples 

 Let  be a complex affine algebraic variety. Its stereotype dual space  (of currents on ) is a Fréchet space. In the special case when  is an affine algebraic group,  becomes an  example of a stereotype group algebra.  
 Let  be a compactly generated Stein group.

See also
Stereotype space
Smith space

Notes

References

 
 
 

Functional analysis
Topological vector spaces